Ferdinand Alexandre Coly (born 10 September 1973) is a Senegalese former professional footballer who played as a full-back.

Career
Coly was born in Dakar. He moved to France when he was 7 years old. He played in all of Senegal's matches in the 2002 FIFA World Cup. After impressing at the tournament, he moved from RC Lens to Birmingham City on loan. But this proved to be a poor career move as he made his debut in the FA Cup against Fulham and then only managed a single Premiership appearance, against Arsenal. Coly left Birmingham in summer 2003 and then moved on to Perugia. In his first season with the Italian club (2003–04), he made 11 appearances but never really impressed. He spent 2004–05 in Serie C (the team descended via playoffs to Serie B then suffered "another relegation", this time in the courts), making 29 appearances and scoring twice. In the summer of 2005 he made a move to Serie A side Parma, where he was a regular.

References

External links

Living people
1973 births
Footballers from Dakar
Association football fullbacks
Ligue 1 players
Premier League players
Serie A players
Serie B players
Stade Poitevin FC players
LB Châteauroux players
RC Lens players
Birmingham City F.C. players
A.C. Perugia Calcio players
Parma Calcio 1913 players
Senegalese footballers
French footballers
Senegalese Christians
French sportspeople of Senegalese descent
Senegal international footballers
2002 FIFA World Cup players
2002 African Cup of Nations players
2004 African Cup of Nations players
2006 Africa Cup of Nations players
Senegalese expatriate footballers
Expatriate footballers in France
Expatriate footballers in Italy
Expatriate footballers in England
Senegalese expatriate sportspeople in England